Lovlina Borgohain (born 2 October 1997) is an Indian boxer. She won a bronze medal at the 2020 Olympic Games in the women's welterweight event, becoming only the third Indian boxer to win a medal at the Olympics. She won bronze medal at the 2018 AIBA Women's World Boxing Championships and the 2019 AIBA Women's World Boxing Championships.  Borgohain is the first female athlete and the second boxer from Assam to represent the state in the Olympics. In 2020, she became the sixth person from Assam to receive Arjuna Award.

Early life 
Borgohain was born on 2 October 1997, and hails from the Golaghat district of Assam. Her parents are Tiken and Mamoni Borgohain. Her father Tiken is a small-scale businessman and struggled financially to support his daughter's ambition. A former Muay Thai practitioner, Lovlina, as the youngest of three sister-siblings, got interested in boxing after seeing her twin sisters, Licha and Lima take up kickboxing and followed the same trail. The Sports Authority of India held trials at her high school Barpathar Girls High School, where Borgohain participated. She was noticed and selected by renowned Coach Padum Chandra Bodo at the SAI STC Guwahati from 2012 to learn basics of boxing and to achieve the excellence in boxing. She was later coached by Sandhya Gurung.

Career 
She won gold medal at the 1st India Open International Boxing Tournament in New Delhi and silver medal at the 2nd India Open International Boxing Tournament in Guwahati.

Borgohain's career's biggest break came when she was selected to participate in the 2018 Commonwealth Games welterweight boxing category. However, her announcement was the subject of controversy after it was found out that she hadn't received any official intimation about her selection. She found out about her selection after the story broke at a major media outlet. At the Commonwealth Games, she lost to Sandy Ryan from the UK in the quarterfinals. Sandy Ryan eventually went on to win gold in that category.

Her selection in the 2018 Commonwealth Games was attributed to her success at the inaugural India Open – an international boxing championship held in February 2018 – where she won a gold medal in the welterweight category. She had also won the bronze medal at the Asian Boxing Championships in Vietnam in November 2017 and the bronze medal at the President's Cup held in Astana in June 2017.

She later won a silver medal at the Ulaanbaatar Cup in Mongolia in June 2018 and a bronze medal at the 13th International Silesian Championship in Poland in September 2018.

2018 AIBA Women's World Boxing Championships
She represented India for the first time at the AIBA Women's World Boxing Championship, held in New Delhi, where she won the bronze medal in the welterweight category on 23 November 2018.

2019 AIBA Women's World Boxing Championships
In 2019, Borgohain got selected for her second Women's World Boxing Championships in Ulan-Ude, Russia, from 3–13 October without trials. Borgohain defeated Morocco's Bel Ahbib Oumayma 5–0 in her round of 16 bout. She was defeated by China's Yang Liu in the 69 kg category semi-final by 2-3 and had to settle with the bronze medal.

2020 Olympics qualifying event
In March 2020, Borgohain secured the Olympic berth in the 69 kg with a 5–0 win over Maftunakhon Melieva of Uzbekistan in the 2020 Asia & Oceania Boxing Olympic Qualification Tournament. With this, she has become the first ever sportswoman from Assam to qualify for the Olympics. She lost to the 2018 AIBA Women's World Boxing Championships silver-medallist Gu Hong of China in a unanimous 5-0 verdict and signed off with a bronze medal at the Asian Olympic Qualifiers.

Borgohain trained at Assisi, Italy from 15 October to 5 December 2020 for World Olympic qualifying event scheduled for May – June 2021.

2020 Tokyo Olympics 
Borgohain is the first female athlete and the second boxer from Assam to represent the state in the Olympics. She defeated the German boxer Nadine Apetz in the primary rounds and on 30 July 2021, she defeated Taiwan's Chen Nien-chin and which assured her a medal. India women's boxing team head coach Raffaelle Bergamesco told The Times of India in an interview, "She wanted to win and that was a fundamental change. Lovlina is a girl who is very attached to her family, to her fellow citizens. I tried to motivate her by shouting that the whole of India was watching her and she could write her own story" In the semifinals she lost to the world no. 1 and eventual gold medalist Busenaz Sürmeneli and took home the bronze medal.

2022 IBA Women's World Boxing Championships
She lost to Cindy Ngamba of Fair Chance Team 1-4 in the pre-quarter finals. Borgohain had again defeated former world champion Chen Nien-Chin in the first round.

Awards and recognition 
 Civilian awards
 Asom Sourav, 2nd highest civilian award of Assam, 2021
 National awards
  Arjuna Award, presented by President Ram Nath Kovind virtually for her outstanding performance in boxing.
Khel Ratna Award in 2021, highest sporting honour of India.
 Rewards
For winning the bronze medal at the 2020 Tokyo Summer Olympics -
  from the Board of Control for Cricket in India.
  from the Government of Assam.
  from the Government of India.
   from the Assam Pradesh Congress Committee.

Personal life 
In 2019, Borgohain signed up with sports management firm Infinity Optimal Solutions (IOS) which will handle her endorsements and commercial interests.

In 2022, Borgohain was appointed as deputy superintendent of police by Assam Government. In May 2022, she was elected as the chair and a voting member on the Board of Directors for International Boxing Association (amateur) Athletes' Committee.

See also 
 Boxing in India
 Indian Boxing Federation
 Boxing at the Summer Olympics

References

External links 

 Lovlina Borgohain at Indian Boxing Federation
 
 Lovlina Borgohain Profile Page:238
 
 

1997 births
Living people
Indian women boxers
Welterweight boxers
AIBA Women's World Boxing Championships medalists
People from Golaghat district
Recipients of the Arjuna Award
Sportswomen from Assam
Boxers from Assam
Boxers at the 2020 Summer Olympics
Olympic boxers of India
Olympic bronze medalists for India
Olympic medalists in boxing
Medalists at the 2020 Summer Olympics
Boxers at the 2022 Commonwealth Games
Commonwealth Games competitors for India
Recipients of the Khel Ratna Award
21st-century Indian women